The Bangulzai Hills are a low mountain range located in the Kalat District of Balochistan Province, in southwestern Pakistan.

See also
Geography of Balochistan, Pakistan

References

Kalat District
Mountain ranges of Balochistan (Pakistan)